Jim Rippey (born May 11, 1970) is a former American professional snowboarder and snowboard designer for Burton Snowboards.

Career
In the 1980s, Rippey became a professional snowboarder and accepted a sponsorship with Burton Snowboards. He was known for his extreme mountain freestyle snowboarding, which entailed boarding the largest mountains in the world and reaching the highest speeds and airs possible. Rippey made a name for himself in the 1990s by front and backflipping off of large cliffs in notable backcountry spots. He is also the first person to land a backflip on a snowmobile.

Competitions and awards
 Winner, Burton U.S. Open 1997, Straight Jump
 Winner, Air & Style Contest 1997, Innsbruck
 Winner, Vans World Championships 1998, Straight Jump Winner
 Third Place, X-Games 1998 Space
 Winner, Göteborg Megastar Contest 1998, Straight Jump Winner
 Winner, Vans Triple Crown, Snow Summit 2001
 Big Air, (Straight Jump) Weltmeister 1998

Personal life
As of 2011, Rippey has become the minister of Grace Church in Reno, Nevada. Rippey lives with his wife of ten years, Jennifer, and their three-year-old son, Jobe.

Film and television
For the 1998 Winter Olympics, Rippey was a Play-by-play announcer for the snowboarding competitions.
 Ripley's Believe It or Not! (TV series) Himself – Episode #4.10 (2003)
 I Know What You Did Last Winter (video short) Himself (1998)
 Snowriders II (documentary) Himself (1997)
 Black Diamond Rush (documentary) Himself (1993)

External links
 Official website
 Video footage
 Rippey talks about snowboarding and his faith

References

1970 births
Living people
People from Quincy, California
American male snowboarders